Manville may refer to:

People
 David Manville (born 1934), English cricketer
 Dick Manville (born 1926), baseball pitcher
 Edward Manville (1862–1933), electrical engineer, industrialist and politician
 Françoise Eléonore Dejean de Manville (1749–1827), Countess of Sabran 
 Helen Adelia Manville (1839–1912), American poet and litterateur
 Lesley Manville (born 1956), English actress
 Manville S. Hodgson (born 1843), politician
 Mikey Manville (born 1980), musician and lyricist
 Tommy Manville (1894–1967), Manhattan socialite

Places in the United States
 Manville, Illinois
 Manville, Indiana
 Manville, New Jersey
 Manville, Rhode Island
 Manville, South Carolina
 Manville, Wyoming

Other
 Johns Manville, building products company
 Manville gun

See also
 Mannville (disambiguation)

English-language surnames